Rosebrook is a locality in the City of Maitland in the Hunter Region of New South Wales, Australia.

References